Trauttmansdorff Castle is a castle located south of the city of Merano, South Tyrol, northern Italy. It is home to the Touriseum, a museum of tourism and since 2001 the surrounding grounds have been open as the Trauttmansdorff Castle Gardens, a botanical garden.

During the years of fascist Italy the castle was called di Nova Castle (Torrente Nova is the name of a little brook near Trauttmansdorff).

References

External links 

Castles in South Tyrol
Merano
Tourism museums